You Are Not Alone is a 1978 Danish coming-of-age film written by Lasse Nielsen and Bent Petersen, directed by Lasse Nielsen and Ernst Johansen and produced by Steen Herdel.

Synopsis 
Set in a Danish all-boys boarding school, one of the boys, Bo (Anders Agensø), develops a special relationship with the headmaster's young son, Kim (Peter Bjerg). In the beginning of the film the headmaster is trying to get funding for a new gym for the school. The boarding school is likely a Christian one, as they have school prayer and the teachers keep referring to good Christian morals.

In another plotline, a troubled student is expelled for displaying sexually charged posters. Some of the students decide to protest this by walking-out of classes. The boy is eventually allowed to return to school so that he may graduate. At the year-end graduation ceremony, the boys present to the entire school and their families a short film they made by themselves based on the commandment "Love thy neighbour".

Cast
 Anders Agensø as Bo
 Peter Bjerg as Kim
 Ove Sprogøe as Kims father - Forstander
 Elin Reimer as Kims mother
 Jan Jørgensen as Lærer Jens Carstensen
 Jørn Faurschou as Lærervikar Andersen
 Merete Axelberg as Lærer Mortensen
 John Hahn-Petersen as Lærer Justesen
 Hugo Herrestrup as Conradsen
 Beatrice Palner as Fru Jensen
 Aske Jacoby as Aske
 Ole Meyer as Ole

Controversy 
The film stills holds up as being somewhat controversial, particularly in the United States, not only for its subject matter of an adolescent same-sex romance, but also for its scene that shows both young lead actors; Agensø (age 16 at the time) and Bjerg (who was 12) in full frontal nudity, taking a shower together and share a swift hug. At the end of the film Bo takes off his younger friend Kim's shirt, and they both share a romantic lengthy French kiss.

Regarding Bo's and Kim's relationship, when director Lasse Nielsen was asked if the film could be made today he responded: "No, I don’t believe the film could be made today. We have an unfortunate situation of self-censorship these days".

However he also commented on the world's view on homosexuality by stating: "In many ways, there is more tolerance. On YouTube, for example, you can see many young boys "coming out" as gay. And – at least in Denmark – parents are becoming more accepting. I’m not sure there has been much progress in U.S.A. however, where many young gay teenagers are still driven to suicide because of general and specific social harassment".

Sexual abuse
In 2018 six male and sixteen female former child actors accused the two directors of sexual abuse during the production of You Are Not Alone and other films. The accusations were covered widely in Danish media, and Ernst Johansen admitted to having had sex with under-age female actors, but claims to not having been aware of the age of consent (15 years in Denmark), and that the girls made a pass on him first.

References

Literature
 Murray, Raymond: Images in the Dark: An Encyclopedia of Gay and Lesbian Film and Video. N.Y., TLA Publications, 1994.

External links 

 
 
 Lasse Nielsen on his film ” You Are Not Alone “

1978 films
1970s Danish-language films
Danish LGBT-related films
1978 romantic drama films
Teen LGBT-related films
1978 LGBT-related films
LGBT-related coming-of-age films
Gay-related films
LGBT-related drama films
Films set in boarding schools